Dominique Trempont is a US executive and board member in large multinational high tech companies and start-ups.

Career
Located in Silicon Valley, Dominique Trempont serves on the board of directors of private and public companies, with strategic focus on disruptive technologies, emerging markets and Asia: Energy Recovery Inc (NASDAQ: ERII - $60M) that makes desalination affordable and is the second cleantech company to have gone public in 2008. RealNetworks (NASDAQ: RNWK - $400M) that is in on-line entertainment (video, music, SMS, ringtones, games).  The Daily Mail and General trust (London Stock Exchange  DMGT.L – £2.1B), a B2B and B2C media company, focused on content and publishing apps. ON24 ($70M - private), a software as a service company, webcasting and virtual shows. And Trion Worlds, a private Online Gaming company. Trempont also teaches: Building Businesses in Silicon Valley at the INSEAD Business School (Europe/Singapore).

Trempont is a patent holder in artificial intelligence: distributed customer relationship management systems and methods US 20020133392 A1

He spent the first 14 years of his career as a key executive at Raychem, a company focusing in material science and a precursor of the cleantech space, with worldwide responsibilities and a focus on large scale turnarounds in the United States, China, India, Japan, Latin America and Europe. Raychem was a billion dollar company operating globally in 80 countries and was later acquired by Tyco.

In 1993, Steve Jobs recruited Trempont to turn around NeXT, first as CFO then to lead operations, while Steve Jobs focused on Pixar. Dominique led NeXT's shift from hardware to Internet focused software and brought the company to profitability. He successfully restructured the company financially, organizationally and strategically, and sold NeXT to Apple in 1997 for $462M.

In 1997, Trempont joined hands with the founder of Gemplus (now renamed Gemalto), world leader in smart cards, and became CEO of Gemplus Corp. He built a highly profitable $150M new business in two years by focusing on the convergence of mobile consumer applications, micro-payments and on-line security. Gemplus has since gone public and is now a 2 billion dollar company.

In 1999, Trempont became chairman and CEO of Kanisa, an early-stage enterprise natural language search & knowledge management software start-up. He focused the venture on customer self-service, contact center, and peer support applications. The company merged with ConsonaCRM in 2007.

Between 1996 and 1997, Trempont sat on the board of Verity (NASDAQ: VRTY), in enterprise search.

In 1998, Trempont became a founding investor in Signio, an online payment platform. Signio was sold to Verisign for $700M in 1999 and, a couple of years later, was acquired by eBay/PayPal.

In 2006, he joined the board and chaired the Finance and Audit Committee of 3Com (NASDAQ, COMS), a global computer networking solutions company; 3Com was acquired for $3.3B by Hewlett-Packard in 2010.

Education
Trempont has a master of business administration from INSEAD, and a BA in business administration and software engineering from the University of Louvain, Belgium.

References

External links
 Profile on Forbes.com

American computer businesspeople
Living people
INSEAD alumni
Year of birth missing (living people)